Helvetiaplatz may refer to several squares named after Helvetia in Switzerland:

 in Basel; see Helvetiaplatz (Basel)
 in Bern; see 
 in Luzern; see Helvetiaplatz (Luzern)
 in Zürich; see Helvetiaplatz (Zürich)